Paweł Maciej Deląg (born 29 April 1970 in Kraków) is a Polish actor.

Filmography

 Schindler's List (Lista Schindlera, 1993, USA) - Dolek Horowitz
 Death In Shallow Water (Halal sekely vizben, 1994, Hungary) - Peter
 Fitness Club (1995, TV Series)
 Young Wolves (Młode wilki, 1995, Poland)
 Sortez Des Rangs (1996, France)
 Szamanka (1996, France, Switzerland, Poland) - Jules
 Queen of Thieves (Królowa złodziei; French title: Marion du faouet,1997, TV Movie, France, Poland) - Prévost
 Killer (Kiler, 1997, Poland) - Camera Operator
 Young Wolves 1/2 (Młode Wilki 1/2) (1997) - Biedrona
 Sława i Chwala (1998, TV Mini-Series, Poland) - Niewolin
 Love and Do What You Want (Kochaj i rób co chcesz, 1998, Poland) - Darek
 Dark Side of Venus (Ciemna strona Wenus, 1998, Poland)
 Gold of Deserters (Złoto dezerterów, 1998, Poland)
 Life Like a Poker (Życie jak poker, 1998–1999, TV series)
 Siedlisko (1999, TV Series, Poland) - Jacek
 A Date with a Devil (1999)
 Palce lizać (TV Series, 1999)
 Tenderness and Lies (Czułość i kłamstwa, 1999, TV Series)
 Police Officers (Policjanci, 1999, TV Mini-Series) - Nyga
 Tiger's of Europe (Tygrysy Europy, 1999, TV Series) - Jacek Laskowski
 Boys Don't Cry (Chłopaki nie płaczą, 2000, Poland) - Jarek Psikuta
 Success (Sukces, 2000, TV Series)
 Quo Vadis (2001, USA, Poland) - Marcus Vinicius
 Fishing Season (Sezon na leszcza, 2001) - Kochany
 Hacker (Haker, 2002, Poland) - Daniel
 The Kowalski Brothers (2002)
 Let's Make Ourselves a Grandson (Zróbmy sobie wnuka, 2003, Poland) - Janek Kosela
 Boars (Dziki, 2004, TV Mini-Series, Poland) - Szwarc
 Les Femmes D'abord (2005, TV Movie, France) - Vutkovic
 Na dobre i na Złe (TV Series, 2006-2008, Poland) - Dr. Stanislaw Dzrzewiecki
 I'll Show You! (Ja wam pokażę!, 2006, Poland) - Adam
 How We Hated Each Other (Nous nous sommes tant haïs, 2007, TV Series) - Jürgen Köller
 The Mystery of the Secret Cipher (Tajemnica twierdzy szyfrów, 2007, TV series, Poland) - Howard Compaigne
 Criminals (Kryminalni, 2008, TV Series, Poland) - Grzegorz Niwinski
 House (2008, USA) - Officer Lawdale
 Put (2009) - (uncredited)
 The Magic Stone (2009, USA, Poland) - President
 The 5th Execution (Ключ Саламандры, 2011, USA, Russia, Netherlands) - Ivanych
 In your eyes (В твоих глазах, 2011, TV Series, Russia)
 Marry a general (Выйти замуж за генерала, 2011, TV Series, Russia)
 Marriage under the will 2. Sandra's comeback (Брак по завещанию 2. Bозвращение Сандры, 2011, TV Series, Russia)
 Two (Двое, 2011, Russia)
 Second Love (Вторая любовь, 2011, Russia)
 German (Немец, 2011, TV Series, Belarus)
 The Destiny of Rome (2011, TV Series, France) - Marc Antoine
 Komisarz Blond i Oko sprawiedliwości (2012) - Marek
 1812. Ulanskaya ballada (2012) - Ledokhovskiy
 Viking (2016) - Anastas
 "Отель последней надежды" (2016) -Oficer ang. sluzby bezpieczenstwa Den Walsh
 Vsetko alebo nic (2017) - Bystrican
 Gwiazdy'' (2017) - Hans Villmeier

Personal Life 

He dated polish model, Bogna Sworowska, in the late 1990's.

Sources
https://web.archive.org/web/20060721160913/http://film.onet.pl/3403,1,osoba.html (in Polish)
https://web.archive.org/web/20040708073155/http://www.lecinema.pl/lk/gw091710.php (in Polish)

References

1970 births
Male actors from Kraków
Living people
Polish male film actors
Polish male television actors